John Wilde (December 12, 1919 – March 9, 2006, pronounced "WILL-dee") was a painter, draughtsman and printmaker of fantastic imagery. Born near Milwaukee, Wilde lived most of his life in Wisconsin, save for service in the U.S. Army during World War II. He received bachelor and master degrees in art from the University of Wisconsin–Madison, where he taught for some 35 years. Wilde was associated with the Magic Realism movement and Surrealism in the United States. His darkly humorous figurative imagery often included self-portraits through which he interacted with the people, animals and surreal objects that populate his fantasy world.

Early influences

The youngest of three boys born to Emil and Mathilda Wilde, John Henry Wilde was born near Milwaukee, Wisconsin on December 12, 1919. As a youth he met Karl Priebe (1914–1976) who later became Wilde's colleague in art and a life-long friend. While in high school Wilde visited the Milwaukee studios of Santos Zingale (1908–1999) and Alfred Sessler (1901–1963) and realized that his own talent for drawing could lead to a viable career. Soon after this he began informal study with Milwaukee painter Paul Clemens (1911–1992). As an undergraduate in art at the University of Wisconsin–Madison, Wilde met the artist Marshall Glasier (1902–1989). In the late 1930s Glasier studied at the Art Students League but found it difficult in Depression-era New York to make his way an artist. He returned to the home of his youth in Madison, where he lived with his parents for the next twenty years, setting up his art studio in the attic of their house.
According to Wilde, Glasier became “the hub of—the catalyst for—the most exciting art event Madison had experienced…” Although Glasier was not connected with the university, the casual salons he regularly hosted at his parents’ home where a gathering place for students, faculty and “other Madison personalities” who wanted to discuss contemporary literature, art and music. Glazier and the young artists in his circle rejected the American Regionalist painting of the day, which was exemplified by the work of John Steuart Curry, who was artist-in-residence at the University of Wisconsin from 1936 to 1946. The dissenters coalesced into a loosely organized group that included Glasier, Wilde, Sylvia Fein (b. 1919) and Dudley Huppler (1917–1988) in Madison, Wisconsin; Karl Priebe (1914–1976) in Milwaukee and Gertrude Abercrombie (1909–1977) in Chicago. Wilde also met and married fellow art student Helen Ashman (1919–1966) in 1942. The group of friends often met at Karl Priebe's studio in Milwaukee and frequented the Chicago home of Gertrude Abercrombie, whose gatherings of artists and jazz musicians were legendary.

Another influence on Wilde’s early career was an art professor at the University of Wisconsin, James S. Watrous (1908–1999). A  draughtsman, muralist, mosaicist and art historian, Watrous taught ‘old master’ methods of drawing and painting using the materials and techniques of European painting and drawing from the Middle Ages to the nineteenth century. He taught his students how to make their own inks, chalks and crayons from materials found in nature, how to craft reed and quill pens and how to prepare grounds for metal point drawing, including silver point, the medium in which Wilde became a modern master. Wilde took Watrous's lessons to heart, poring over recipes for oil mediums and eventually formulating a secret mixture for use in his own work.

Wartime Journal

Wilde received his bachelor of science degree in 1942 and was drafted into the US Army shortly thereafter. He served with the Infantry Air Force and the Office of Strategic Services (OSS). As an artist he was assigned to produce drawings for the army venereal disease program and maps and terrain models for intelligence. During this time he kept a private journal that he filled with self-portraits, fantastic and macabre scenes and written reflections on the Army, an institution he despised for its regimentation and bureaucracy. In the journal’s pictures and words, Wilde also documented his increasing feeling of hopelessness as his term of service stretched into years. In spite of his deepening depression, Wilde saw broader artistic possibilities in some of his journal sketches, working them up into larger drawings that he mailed to Dudley Huppler in Wisconsin.  According to art historian Robert Cozzolino, in his later career Wilde returned "dozens of times" to the unsettling themes and situations that he first explored in his wartime journal. Upon discharge from the Army in 1946, Wilde returned to the University of Wisconsin–Madison where he studied art history, graduating with a Master of Science from the School of Education. His thesis was ostensibly about the Surrealist artist Max Ernst, but Wilde later admitted that the thesis was also a statement of protest against Abstract Expressionism.

Mature Work

Drawing was Wilde’s boyhood means of visual expression and it remained the foundation on which the works of his sixty-year professional career were built. Wilde’s self-described “deep instinctive love of drawing” was a source of puzzlement to him; as a child he was not encouraged in it, nor could he see anything in his social or cultural environment that led to it.  He did, however, have a deep interest in and empathy for nature and its cycle of generation, growth, decay and death. Vegetables, plants and flowers, both wild and cultivated, and animals, especially birds, are the subjects of many of his paintings and drawings. And, more than all, he always returned to the human form, whether invoking the whimsy of surreal situations or regaling in the complex and graceful discipline of fine anatomical drawing, of which Wilde is virtually nonpareil in his century.  Often cryptic notes are included in drawings, from pseudo-Latin inscriptions of the early years to the intentionally didactic ten "Talking Drawings," of the early seventies, in which extensive monologues dominate the page, outlining solitary representations of himself performing daily chores such as raking (Madison Art Center).  The human beings that enter his paintings are often nude, and often of the female sex. Writer Donna Gold described Wilde’s tendency to marry nature to the human figure in improbable ways in his painting, “To Make Strawberry Jam”:

“Wilde… paints an odalisque wrapped in tendrils of a strawberry plant, echoing Botticelli’s ‘The  Birth of Venus’, veiled in her golden hair. A strawberry is what covers Wilde’s woman, but the strawberry she hugs to her breast is huge, half the size of her torso.”

The reference to the Renaissance painter Botticelli is apt. The art historical painting and drawing techniques that Wilde learned in James Watrous’s seminars give his work the look of something from fifteenth century Italy, and is further reflected in his lifelong admiration for the drawing discipline behind the works of North European Renaissance artists.  The "Death and the Maiden" themes derived from the latter recur frequently through the seven decades of his output, as do highly crafted, reverent renderings of natural objects. But, according to curator Sara Krajewski,

“Surrealism best enables [Wilde] to represent the mind’s activity and the pervasive forces of sex and death. Bones, dead animals and scenes of decay serve as memento mori, symbolic reminders of one’s mortality. Naked women, or strangely mutated women-creatures, populate deep, dream-like landscapes. Frequently Wilde paints himself into a scene, as if to acknowledge that this is a world where he confronts his own fears and desires.”

A particularly notable example of this self mise en scene is the 1983-4, 9 1/2 ft long "The Great Autobiographical Silverpoint Drawing," in the Chicago Art Institute.  It depicts the usual Wilde-proxy now nude and triple-eyed, looking out at the viewer in front of rows of familiar figures, with the detritus of a life long-lived on one side and an immense Oak Tree on the other. Though Wilde excels in small, intimate paintings and silver points, this work, meticulously drawn in the unforgiving silver point medium, is quite possibly the largest silver point ever made.

Another large silver point with Wilde amidst a memeto mori landscape was his "Muss Es Sein" (1979–81, operative word "was"). Though quite large in itself, it is only about a third of the size of the AIC leviathan.  The work depicts the semi nude Wilde proxy in its familiar harlequin tights and a nude female sitting mid stage, almost lost amidst an entire field of animal skulls.  They are looking away from the viewer at a double moon. Also extremely meticulously drawn in silver point, the work was photographed and then painted over with Wilde's typical cool transparent oil washes. The greenish gray finale is in the McClain Collection of the Chazen Museum on the UW campus, gift of Bill McClain.

An earlier example of Wilde putting himself into his painting is “Wisconsin Wildeworld,” subtitled “Provincia, Naturlica and Classicum” in the collection of the Milwaukee Art Museum (MAM). The  painting shows the artist, his turned back toward the viewer, gazing into the distance to his right at a fanciful, Renaissance-inspired landscape. The artist’s right arm is extended to measure the pointy-topped mountains ahead of him; in his left arm he cradles a drawing board. Classical ruins jut into the scene from the picture’s right edge. It seems perfectly normal to see the small figures of naked women cavorting among them.  The artist’s figure forms a sort of magical border between this world and a more mundane reality. To his proxy’s left, Wilde laid out the staid lines of a small town residential avenue, complete with elderly frame houses and a tree-lined walk along which fully clothed Midwesterners stroll.

In fact, his 1995 "Wildeworld Revisited," another one of the most important examples of self inclusion, is a match/comparison  piece to the MAM "Wisconsin Wildeworld" described above. Maintaining the same dimensions, the scenario is even more advanced in its state of destruction, with warmer colors in a more barren scene, a cooler toned, graying, semi nude, aged Wilde, not measuring the world stage confidently as before, but pointing tentatively to a dark, cloudy, world-suffocating brown-orange vortex in the sky.  He now holds no drawing board, nor sighting tool, but is just looking and pointing with his back turned toward us.  Most fortuitously this work has recently also been acquired by the MAM, to join its forerunner.

Such "Wilde World" or "Wilde View" depictions recur frequently in his work.  Other recurrent themes include complex female-populated nocturnal festivities (see Sanseverini discussion below), seasonal still-lives, polymorphous "Ladybirds," and curious entanglements of natural botanical forms with female nudes, such as Gold exemplifies above.  His interest in death and decay was continued in the mid eighties with a series of delicately, naturalistically drawn dead animals found around his rural retreat, entitled "R.O.A.E.D" (Remnants of An Early Death).

More recently, primarily from the eighties and nineties, his occasional "Reconsidereds" and related retrospective compositions are paintings revisiting specific works from his earlier decades, especially sketchbooks and drawings for the forties.   And there are many examples taken from originals in his sketchbooks of the forties, many of the latter reproduced in the 1984 Hamady publication noted below ("44 Wilde 1944").  Several large silverpoints gathering multiple heads from the wartime sketchbooks and multiple nudes from throughout his career were also executed around the turn of the century.  And his large 2004 painting (60 in wide), "Myself in 1944 contemplating the Following 60 Years," collects many of these wartime images on a table under the gaze of a large headed Wilde leaning on the table edge, beneath a bright, cirrus-clouded, blue sky.  Another retrospective example is the 1999 oil "Suggestions for Hot Weather Entertainment III," a remake of the 1947 drawing with watercolor "Further Suggestions for Hot Weather Entertainment: or the Relief of National Boredom or a Conclusive Argument Against Long Hair."

One of Wilde's most powerful revisited themes relates loosely to Gina, Duchess of Sanseverina, in Stendhal's  "Charterhouse of Parma." His Sanseverinis (sic) began with such early masterpieces as "Further Festivities at the Contessa Sanseverini's" (1950–51) and "More Festivities at the Palazzo Sanaeverini" (1951–52). Placed in Classical/Renaissance settings, these cavorting-female celebrations are meticulously rendered, bright, sensuous, and surrealistically optimistic.  But the 1966 revisit, "Nighttime Festivities at the Contessa Sanseverini's," not only includes more densely collected, ashen-toned, less mobile female nudes, but also predatory dogs among them and victims' eviscerated corpses, all before an eerily nocturnal, sylvan setting.  In the nineties he revisits Sanseverini again.  "Still Further Festivities at the Contessa Sanseverini's" (1991) now is more ethereal with even more figures which now are atmospherically backlit, mildly turning or dancing, on a plain littered with beach balls instead of vicious canines, all while eight graceful ladies cavort or float in the sunrise sky above.  Finally, "A Grand Finale at the Contessa Severini's" (1996–97) presents a universal, aerial view of even more mostly female figures and animals in an extensive landscape of plain, sea, and mountains, panning from warm sunny left to cool moonlit right, in a canvass fully eight feet wide. In the evening-lit lower right two purplish Wilde figures with revolvers, related to works from the forties, deliberate between confusion and suicide.  Myriads of animals, bimorphous figures, and toys and furnishings, many also reminiscent of earlier Wilde creations, intermingle amidst the female nudes. A plethora of sketches and drawings on charcoal paper related to the Sansavorini paintings of the nineties hale from this late-career revisit, some of which appear from time to time on the market.

In keeping with his historical orientation in teaching (see below), Wilde also painted homages to favorite artists from the past in his last couple decades, especially in the middle eighties; artists such as Piero di Cosimo, particularly his "Perseus Rescuing Andromeda," and works of the Englishman Richard Dadd, Aachen-born Alfred Rethal and other Germans Otto Runge, Otto Dix, and Max Ernst, Switzerland's Arnold Böcklin, and friends Julia Thecla and Gertrude Abercrombie (1985–87).  His four piece "An Homage to Lorenzo Lotto" (I-IV), 1985, is based on Lotto's inscrutable "Allegory of Virtue and Vice" (1505) in the Kress Collection of the National Gallery in DC.  Another group of admireds was the Pre Raphaelite Brethren, Wilde referencing them by name ("PRB") in drawings from mid career. In an even more specific homage, his 1998 painting "My Art Targets," presents facsimile signatures of 38 favorite artists on a light green background, all around a smallish, wobbly, red, white, and blue heart. Citations include Durer, Uccello, Urs Graf, Baldung Gruen, Altdorfer, Brueghel, Watteau, Ingres, Messonnier (sic), Eakins, Homer, Cezanne, Puvis, Dix, Di Chirico, and Ernst, among 22 others. Though the whole may mark expression of respect as much as acknowledgment of influence, many of the referents obviously cut both ways.

Teaching

Wilde taught drawing at the University of Wisconsin–Madison from 1948 until his retirement in 1982 as the Alfred Sessler Distinguished Professor of Art. He was one of a number of influential artists who began to teach at the University after the war, including the printmakers Alfred Sessler (1909–1963) and Warrington Colescott (b. 1921), the painter Gibson Byrd (1923-2002), and the glass artist Harvey Littleton (b. 1922). Aaron Bohrod (1907–1992) took over John Steuart Curry's (1897-1946) position as artist-in-residence at the university in 1948, continuing in the position until 1978. Although he began his career as an urban regionalist, by 1954 Bohrod was firmly associated with magic realism for his trompe-l'œil still lifes. However, he did no teaching, other than rare class visits to his studio, and Wilde held silent disdain for both Bohrod and Curry, believing the intensity of his surreal world more vital (and risk-taking) than their more straightforward simplicity, and the craft of his drawing discipline more demanding than theirs. (Of course both far outsold him and outran him in popular attention through most of mid century.)

In fact, despite his edgy themes, as a life drawing teacher Wilde taught very traditionally, using the model primarily for long poses and expecting close watching and high discipline from students.  With a manner of quiet dignity and a respect for art history not always popular in the department from the sixties on, he incorporated intellectual components in his life drawing class by requiring student-led, exacting critiques of classical drawings.  One assignment necessitated visiting the Graphics Department at the Art Institute of Chicago to examine first-hand a drawing selected from their inventory.

And yet, despite going against the contemporary grain (he knew he was an anomaly among modern and post modern trends), Wilde influenced many students over his 35 years of teaching; for example, three of his more notable are book illustrator Nancy Ekholm Burkert (b. 1933); contemporary artist Bruce Nauman (b. 1941) and Wynn Chamberlain (b. 1929), a magic realist painter and a producer and director of erotic films.

In October–November, 1989, in a spirit of retrospective survey, he headed a group exhibit at Fanny Garver Gallery in Madison with 17 of his former students.  He also designed the exhibition poster based on a silver point (private collection) in which he depicted each participant as an apple-head emerging like a herd from the horizon with himself in the back; suitably so the apples, as apples recur consistently as life-affirming in Wilde's work through the years.  Portraying the many valued former students ("all good apples") as it did, both the poster and show provided further evidence of the extent and quality of Wilde's educational legacy.

Artistic collaborations

Though not enamored of printmaking, feeling it lacked the intimate subtlety of drawing, Wilde was eventually engaged by a number of colleagues to venture into the field over the last third of his career.  He  gained one important artistic collaborator in 1966 when book artist Walter Hamady joined the art department faculty of the University of Wisconsin–Madison. Under the imprimatur of his own Perishable Press (founded in 1964), Hamady worked with a number of contemporary writers and artists to create editions that are "literary, visual, typographic and aethetic exploration[s] of the potential of the book." Books on which Wilde worked with Hamady include "John's Apples" (1995, with poems by Reeve Lindberg, edition of 125); "Nineteen Eighty-five: The Twelve Months" (1992, edition of 130);  "What his mother's son hath wrought: twenty-four representative paintings with excerpts from notebooks kept on and off between the years 1940–1988" (1988, edition of 1,000); "44 Wilde 1944: Being a Selection of 44 Images from a Sketchbook Kept by John Wilde Mostly in 1944" (1984) and "The Story of Jane and Joan" with lettering by Hamady and 12 etchings hand-colored by Wilde (1977, edition of 25 bound, four unbound).  Wilde also produced around 20 oils based on Hamady's personal journals from the mid eighties, 12 of which are reproduced in the 1992 publication "Nineteen Eighty-five: The Twelve Months," mentioned above.

Warrington Colescott collaborated with Wilde on several occasions. In 1985 Colescott printed two large color etchings by Wilde at Colescott's Mantegna Press in Hollandale, Wisconsin, Titled "7 Kiefers" and "8 Russets" (both editions of 100). The prints depict groups of plump pears and green apples.

Wilde also collaborated with Harvey Littleton and Littleton Studios to create three vitreograph prints. Wilde's vitreographs "The Kiss" (edition of 20) and "Portrait of Joan" (edition of 15) were created in 1996; his "Three Trees" (edition of 16) was created in 1998.

The Tandem Press at the University of Wisconsin–Madison was another collaborative venue for Wilde. In 1985 he took the opportunity to produce one lithograph in black ink on white paper there. "Wildeview II" measures 23½ × 36 inches and was published in an edition of 90.

Wilde worked with Andrew Balkin Editions of Madison, Wisconsin to produce "J. & J. Enter the Kingdom of Heaven," a color etching and aquatint that was part of the eleven artist portfolio, "AGB Encore." He later collaborated with the atelier on an aquatint and dry-point print with selective hand-coloring for the "Wisconsin Sesquicentennial Portfolio".

He also collaborated with Colescott on designing the state poster for the Wisconsin Sesquicentennial in 1998.

Honors

Wilde was elected to the Wisconsin Academy of Sciences and Letters in 1982 and to the National Academy of Design in New York City in 1993.  He was also honored as the Alfred Sessler Distinguished Professor of Art, University of Wisconsin Art Department.

Public collections

Wilde's artwork is in the collections of museums throughout the United States, including the Art Institute of Chicago, the Carnegie Museum of Art in Pittsburgh, Pennsylvania, Pennsylvania Academy of Fine Arts in Philadelphia, Santa Barbara Museum of Art, Smithsonian American Art Museum, Walker Art Center in Minneapolis and the Whitney Museum of American Art in New York. In his home state of Wisconsin, Wilde is represented by work in many collections, including the Madison Museum of Contemporary Art, the Chazen Museum of Art at the University of Wisconsin–Madison, the Milwaukee Art Museum, the Racine Art Museum, and the Leigh Yawkey Woodson Art Museum in Wausau, Wisconsin.

Personal

John Wilde and his wife Helen had two children, Jonathan and Phoebe Wilde. After Helen's death in 1966, Wilde married the former Shirley Grilley. His stepchildren are Robert, Dorian and Rinalda Grilley. He lived in or near Evansville and Cooksville, Rock County, Wisconsin most of his adult life. The Tory Folliard Gallery in Milwaukee has represented John Wilde since 1993. Since 2015 the Tory Folliard Gallery has been the exclusive representative of works by John Wilde from the John and Shirley Wilde Estate.

References 

1919 births
2006 deaths
20th-century American painters
American male painters
21st-century American painters
Artists from Milwaukee
Trompe-l'œil artists
University of Wisconsin–Madison College of Letters and Science alumni
People from Evansville, Wisconsin
20th-century American male artists